Jay Ward Carver (February 19, 1881 – July 22, 1942) was a Vermont lawyer who served as state Attorney General.

Biography
J. Ward Carver was born in Calais, Vermont on February 19, 1881.  He was raised in Marshfield, graduated from Montpelier High School, and then graduated from Goddard Seminary in 1900.

While teaching school Carver studied law with Barre attorney John W. Gordon, was admitted to the bar in 1905, and practiced in Barre.  A Republican, he served as Barre's corporation counsel, State's Attorney for Washington County, and a member of the Vermont State Senate.

In 1925 Carver was appointed Vermont Attorney General, filling the vacancy caused by the resignation of Frank C. Archibald.  Carver was elected to full terms in 1926 and 1928, and served from 1925 to 1931.

In the 1930s Carver practiced law in partnership with Stanley C. Wilson, F. Ray Keyser Sr., and Deane C. Davis.  Their firm was described as Vermont's "best ever collection of legal talent," in that it included one Vermont Supreme Court Justice (Keyser), two Governors (Wilson and Davis), and one state Attorney General (Carver).

From 1935 to 1936 Carver served as president of the Vermont Bar Association.

Carver died in Barre on July 22, 1942.  He was buried at Elmwood Cemetery in Barre.

Family
In 1911, Carver married Zoe H. Towers of Richmond.

Sources

1881 births
1942 deaths
People from Barre, Vermont
Goddard College alumni
Vermont lawyers
State's attorneys in Vermont
Republican Party Vermont state senators
Vermont Attorneys General
20th-century American politicians
Burials in Vermont
American lawyers admitted to the practice of law by reading law
20th-century American lawyers